is a Japanese politician who served as a member of the House of Representatives from 1983 to 2016, as Minister of Finance from 2003 to 2006, as  President of the Liberal Democratic Party and Leader of the Opposition from 2009 to 2012, as Minister of Justice from 2012 to 2014, and as LDP Secretary-General from 2014 to 2016. He was only the second LDP leader who was not simultaneously Prime Minister of Japan. He retired from politics following a spinal cord injury in 2016 that saw him using a wheelchair.

Early life and education
Tanigaki was born in Fukuchiyama on 7 March 1945. He attended Azabu High School. He graduated from the faculty of law at the University of Tokyo in 1974, and worked as a secretary for his father, who was the then minister of education. He went on to pass the Japanese bar examination in 1979, specializing in tax law, and he registered as an attorney in 1982 after completing his legal training.

Political career
Tanigaki was prepared for a legal career after close to ten years of study, but his father, who represented the 2nd district in Kyoto, died in 1983. Tanigaki moved to Kyoto to run for his father's seat. He briefly headed the Science and Technology Agency in 1997. Under the then prime minister Koizumi, he served in a number of positions, including the Financial Reconstruction Commission, the National Public Safety Commission, and ultimately as Minister of Finance from 22 September 2003 to 26 September 2006. Since 2002, Tanigaki has led a minor faction in the Liberal Democratic Party, formerly part of the Kōchikai faction, with 11 members in the lower house and 4 in the upper house.

Tanigaki declared his candidacy for the LDP presidency on July 28, 2006, but came in third place in a three-way race against Shinzō Abe and Tarō Asō. Tanigaki was viewed as the "moderate" candidate in the race, mainly due to his foreign policy views: unlike Abe and Asō, he stated that he would not continue visits to Yasukuni Shrine if he became prime minister, which made him a more attractive candidate among LDP leaders who sought better relations with Chinese and Korean leadership. Tanigaki is affiliated to the openly revisionist lobby Nippon Kaigi, which advocates visits of Prime Ministers to the controversial shrine.

On 24 September 2007, Tanigaki was named chief policymaker of the LDP by newly elected party president Yasuo Fukuda. He was subsequently appointed as minister of construction and transport on 1 August 2008.

Opposition leader (2009-2012) 
On 28 September 2009, he was elected by his party as LDP leader to replace former prime minister Tarō Asō after the Democratic Party of Japan achieved a landslide election result in the 2009 general election and took government from the LDP.

In the early period of the Democratic Party of Japan government, Tanigaki frequently condemned the DPJ for advocating for a rise in the sales taxes by 5 percent, in spite of the enormous, problematic national deficit, and despite his own past calls to increase the tax.

To gain a potential legislative LDP-coalition majority, he attempted an unsuccessful no-confidence motion against Naoto Kan in June 2011, after refusing Kan's earlier offers of a grand coalition.

In 2012, the LDP under Tanigaki worked with prime minister Yoshihiko Noda of the ruling DPJ to pass an increase in the consumption tax from the current 5% to 8% in April 2014 and 10% in October 2015. He agreed not to introduce a no-confidence motion or a censure motion against Noda, in return for Noda's promise to hold elections "soon." On 28 August 2012, soon after the consumption tax bills were passed through the diet a censure motion was passed by the LDP and the New Komeito Party against Prime Minister Noda. The opposition parties were to boycott debate in the chamber, meaning that new bills passed in the DPJ-controlled House of Representatives could not be enacted.

Tanigaki had expected to be re-elected as LDP head unopposed in 2012, but former Prime Minister Shinzō Abe and several others suggested that they could run against him. He lost the party election to Abe on 26 September 2012. As a result, he became only the second LDP leader, after Yōhei Kōno (1993–1995), who never served as Prime Minister.

Abe government (2012-2016) 
Following the LDP's victory in the 2012 general election, Abe appointed his three rivals from the LDP leadership contest to cabinet posts, with Tanigaki serving as Minister of Justice.

Abe appointed Tanigaki to serve as LDP Secretary-General in September 2014, placing Tanigaki in charge of the party's campaign strategy. In this post, Tanigaki continued to have weekly meetings with Abe, in which he provided constructive criticism of Abe's policy agenda. He agreed not to stand against Abe in the 2015 LDP leadership election despite their intense personal rivalry and differing political philosophies.

Injury and retirement 
Tanigaki injured his spinal cord in a bicycle accident in July 2016, and remained hospitalized as of September 2017. He stayed out of the public eye during his hospitalization, and was rumored to be planning a comeback to politics as of mid-2017, but decided not to run in the 2017 general election due to his physical condition. He made his first public appearance after the accident in October 2018, and addressed the Liberal Democratic Party Convention from a wheelchair in February 2019. The LDP approached him to run in the 2019 House of Councillors election, but he turned down the request, stating that he would focus on his rehabilitation.

Honours
:
 Grand Cordon of the Order of the Rising Sun (2019)

References

External links

1945 births
Azabu High School alumni
Japanese Protestants
Presidents of the Liberal Democratic Party (Japan)
Living people
Members of the House of Representatives (Japan)
Ministers of Finance of Japan
Members of Nippon Kaigi
Ministers of Land, Infrastructure, Transport and Tourism of Japan
People from Kyoto Prefecture
Politicians from Tokyo
University of Tokyo alumni
Ministers of Justice of Japan
21st-century Japanese politicians
Grand Cordons of the Order of the Rising Sun